Gendgeegiin Batmönkh (born 10 August 1944) is a Mongolian cross-country skier. He competed in the men's 15 kilometre event at the 1968 Winter Olympics.

References

1944 births
Living people
Mongolian male cross-country skiers
Olympic cross-country skiers of Mongolia
Cross-country skiers at the 1968 Winter Olympics
People from Khövsgöl Province
20th-century Mongolian people